Hidir Lutfi (1880 – 23 June 1959) was an Iraqi poet. Born in Kirkuk in a Konyan Turkish family, he studied Arabic, Persian and Turkish. He has an unprinted Diwan of poetry, many literary researches, and a book in the history of Kirkuk. He died in his hometown and was buried there.

References 

1880 births
1959 deaths
Iraqi Turkish poets
Persian-language poets
19th-century poets of Ottoman Iraq
20th-century Iraqi poets
People from Kirkuk
Iraqi people of Turkish descent
Iraqi multilingual poets
Iraqi Turkmen people
Iraqi Yarsanis